The 1937 Giro d'Italia was the 25th edition of the Giro d'Italia, organized and sponsored by the newspaper La Gazzetta dello Sport. The race was won by Gino Bartali of the Legnano team, with fellow Italians Giovanni Valetti and Enrico Mollo coming in second and third respectively.

Participants

Of the 98 riders that began the Giro d'Italia on 8 May, 41 of them made it to the finish in Milan on 30 May. Riders were allowed to ride on their own or as a member of a team or group; 65riders competed as part of a team, while the remaining 33 competed independently. The four teams that partook in the race were: Bianchi, Fréjus, Ganna, and Legnano. Each team was composed of seven riders. There were also seven groups, made up of five riders each, that participated in the race. Those groups were: Italiani All'Estero, Bertoldo, Il Littoriale, S S. Parioli, Belgi, Svizzeri, and Tedeschi.

The peloton was composed primarily of Italian riders. The field featured four former Giro d'Italia winners with the 1931 race winner Francesco Camusso, 1934 winner Learco Guerra, Vasco Bergamaschi who won the race in 1935, and returning champion Gino Bartali. Other notable Italian riders included Olimpio Bizzi, Giovanni Valetti, and Giuseppe Olmo. Notable foreign entrants were the Belgian riders Alfons Deloor, Alfons Schepers, and Antoine Dignef, and also the Swiss rider Leo Amberg who placed high at the 1936 Tour de France.

Route and stages

Classification leadership

The leader of the general classification – calculated by adding the stage finish times of each rider – wore a pink jersey. This classification is the most important of the race, and its winner is considered as the winner of the Giro.

The liberi classification, one similar to the general classification was calculated, using only independent riders and riders that came as members of groups.

In the mountains classification, the race organizers selected different mountains that the route crossed and awarded points to the riders who crossed them first.

The winner of the team classification was determined by adding the finish times of the best three cyclists per team together and the team with the lowest total time was the winner. If a team had fewer than three riders finish, they were not eligible for the classification. The group classification was decided in the same manner, but the classification was exclusive to the competing groups.

The rows in the following table correspond to the jerseys awarded after that stage was run.

Final standings

General classification

Liberi classification

Mountains classification

Team classification

Group classification

References

Notes

Citations

Bibliography

1937
Giro d'Italia
Giro d'Italia
Giro d'Italia